Espeme is the undergraduate program of the Edhec Business School in Lille, Nice and Paris. The four-year program leads to a Bachelor of Business Administration.

Espeme was created in 1988 for school-leavers with specializations in finance, marketing and human resources.

The school is usually ranked fourth among business schools accessible after the Baccalauréat or A-level or High school diploma in France after ESSCA, IESEG School of Management and EPSCI.
In 2003, the ESPEME diploma is endorsed by the French Ministry of Education. However, EDHEC Business School and all its programs has been awarded international AACSB accreditation and the European EQUIS label.

Education in France